Saarinen is a Finnish surname. Notable people with the surname include:
 Aarne Saarinen, Finnish politician
 Aino-Kaisa Saarinen, Finnish skier
 Aline B. Saarinen (1914–1972), American art and architecture critic
 Ari Saarinen (born 1967), Finnish ice hockey player
 Arno Saarinen, Finnish gymnast
 Eliel Saarinen, Finnish architect
 Eero Saarinen, son of Eliel, also a Finnish architect and furniture designer
 Eeva Saarinen, Finnish breaststroke swimmer
 Eric Saarinen (born 1942), American cinematographer and film director
 Esa Saarinen, Finnish philosopher
 Ingegerd Saarinen, Swedish politician
 Jaana Saarinen, Finnish actress
 Janne Saarinen, Finnish footballer
 Jarno Saarinen, (1945–1973), Finnish motorcycle racer
 Jenni Saarinen, Finnish figure skater
 Jesse Saarinen (born 1985), Finnish ice hockey player
 Johanna Saarinen (born 1973), Finnish biathlete
 Lilian Swann Saarinen (1912–1995), American sculptor and artist
 Mari Saarinen, Finnish ice hockey player
 Martti Saarinen, Finnish singer
 Olavi Saarinen, Finnish politician
 Ossi Saarinen, Finnish ice hockey player
 Pekka Saarinen, Finnish car racer
 Sakari Saarinen, Finnish footballer
 Sanna Saarinen (born 1991), Finnish women's footballer
 Simo Saarinen, Finnish ice hockey player
 Tero Saarinen (born 1964), Finnish dancer and choreographer
 Veli Saarinen, Finnish cross-country skier
 Yrjö Saarinen (1899–1977), Finnish engineer and politician
 Yrjö Saarinen (painter) (1899–1958), Finnish painter

See also

Finnish-language surnames